William James Riley (1855–1887), nicknamed "Pigtail Billy", was an outfielder in Major League Baseball. He played for the 1875 Keokuk Westerns and the 1879 Cleveland Blues.

References

External links

1855 births
1887 deaths
Major League Baseball outfielders
Keokuk Westerns players
Cleveland Blues (NL) players
Indianapolis Blues (minor league) players
19th-century baseball players
Baseball players from Cincinnati